Hans Ludvig Martensen, S.J. (6 August 1927 – 13 March 2012) was the Catholic bishop of the Diocese of Copenhagen, Denmark.

Martense was born in Copenhagen. In 1956, he was ordained a priest of the Society of Jesus. In 1965 Pope Paul VI appointed him Bishop of Copenhagen; he was consecrated on 16 May by Bishop Johannes Theodor Suhr, O.S.B. He participated in the 4th Session of the Second Vatican Council in September of that year. He resigned as bishop in 1995 and died in 2012.

Notes

20th-century Roman Catholic bishops in Denmark
1927 births
2012 deaths
Danish Jesuits
Jesuit bishops